Darin may refer to

Places
Darin, Anbarabad, a village in Kerman Province, Iran
Darin, Jebalbarez-e Jonubi, a village in Kerman Province, Iran
Darin, Sistan and Baluchestan, a village in Sistan and Baluchestan Province, Iran
Darin, Yazd, a village in Yazd Province, Iran
Darin, the main harbour on Tarout Island, Saudi Arabia, and an alternate name for the island itself

Music
Darin (singer), a Swedish singer of Kurdish descent, full name Darin Zanyar
 Darin (album), 2015, the second studio album by Swedish singer/songwriter Darin

Other uses
Darin (name), a given name and surname
Treaty of Darin, a 1915 treaty between Ibn Saud and the United Kingdom

See also

Daran (disambiguation)
Daren, Taitung, a township in Taiwan
Darien (disambiguation)
Darren, a male given name
Dıryan or Darian, a village in Azerbaijan